A velocity potential is a scalar potential used in potential flow theory. It was introduced by Joseph-Louis Lagrange in 1788.

It is used in continuum mechanics, when a continuum occupies a simply-connected region and is irrotational. In such a case,

where  denotes the flow velocity. As a result,  can be represented as the gradient of a scalar function :

A velocity potential is not unique. In other words, velocity potentials are unique up to a constant, or a function solely of the temporal variable.

The Laplacian of a velocity potential is equal to the divergence of the corresponding flow. Hence if a velocity potential satisfies Laplace equation, the flow is incompressible.

Unlike a stream function, a velocity potential can exist in three-dimensional flow.

Usage in acoustics

In theoretical acoustics, it is often desirable to work with the acoustic wave equation of the velocity potential  instead of pressure  and/or particle velocity . 

Solving the wave equation for either  field or  field does not necessarily provide a simple answer for the other field. On the other hand, when  is solved for, not only is  found as given above, but  is also easily found—from the (linearised) Bernoulli equation for irrotational and unsteady flow—as

Notes

See also
Vorticity
Hamiltonian fluid mechanics
Potential flow
Potential flow around a circular cylinder

External links
 Joukowski Transform Interactive WebApp

Continuum mechanics